Allan Warnke (October 27, 1946 – June 27, 2021) was a former Liberal member of the Legislative Assembly of British Columbia, Canada. He represented the Richmond-Steveston electoral district from 1991 to 1996.

He also ran as a candidate of the Canadian Action Party in the federal elections of 2000 and 2004.

Warnke was a professor of political science at Vancouver Island University, as well as being the department chair. He died suddenly in June 2021 from heart disease and medical complications due to obesity and hypertension. Allan was predeceased by his wife of forty-one years Geraldine (née Byers).

References

1946 births
2021 deaths
British Columbia Liberal Party MLAs
Canadian Action Party candidates for the Canadian House of Commons
Candidates in the 2000 Canadian federal election
Candidates in the 2004 Canadian federal election
Politicians from Edmonton
McMaster University alumni
University of Toronto alumni
Osgoode Hall Law School alumni
Academic staff of Vancouver Island University